Late Nights & Early Mornings is the debut studio album by English singer Marsha Ambrosius. Recorded after the disbandment of her former band Floetry, it was released by J Records on 1 March 2011 in the United States. Her only album for the label before its dissolution seven months later, it debuted at number two on the US Billboard 200 with 96,400 copies sold in the first week.

Background
Songs from Late Nights & Early Mornings were produced and written by Ambrosius herself with other contributors, including Just Blaze, Dre & Vidal, Focus... and co-writing credits by Alicia Keys and Lauryn Hill The album also contains a cover version of Portishead's "Sour Times". Ambrosius said that the overall vibe of the album is "sensual, it’s sincere, it’s seductive" and also explained, “Not too many women get the opportunity to say what they want, and having controlled and written pretty much everything I get to do all of that on one album. J Records, they understood me as an artist and said, ‘What do you want? How do you want to sound? What do you feel like your album should be’ and they allowed me to go in the studio.” Ambrosius describes the song, "Hope She Cheats on You (With a Basketball Player)" as "the reality of a bad break up."

Promotion
"Hope She Cheats On You (With A Basketball Player)" was released as the album's first single on 13 August 2010. The song peaked on the US Hot R&B/Hip-Hop Songs chart at number twenty-two. "Far Away" was released as the album's second single on 7 December 2010. It is produced by Just Blaze and written by Marsha Ambrosius with co-writing by Sterling Simms. The track was inspired by one of Ambrosius's own friends who committed suicide, and discusses how it feels once someone she's loved is gone. This song has  reached number three on the R&B/Hip-Hop Songs chart. The title track, "Late Nights & Early Mornings", was released as the third single.

Critical reception 

Late Nights & Early Mornings received generally mixed to positive reviews from music critics. Allmusic editor Andy Kellman found that "in a way, Late Nights & Early Mornings picks up where 2005's Flo'Ology, left off [...] Those who could not get into the Floetry albums due to Ambrosius' occasionally tremulous delivery should have no problem this time. The characteristic is no distraction – put to use with less frequency and typically in service to the song, not purely for show." Melody Charles from SoulTracks remarked that the album "captures what is so intriguing about the triple-threat performer: her straight-forward sensuality, her emotional authenticity and the way she grafts those qualities together into melodic masterpieces [...] Self-possessed, skillfully-rendered and undeniably soulful, Ms. Ambrosius' debut is already one of 2011's Must-Haves: if you value depth and dimension in your listening experience, count on having many Late Nights & Early Mornings with this CD/download enveloping your ears."

DJBooth.net's Nathan Slavik referred to the album as a "near-classic," stating "Marsha Ambrosius’ debut is the R&B album of the year." Slant critic Jesse Cataldo wrote that "despite the appearance of established hip-hop producers and the vocal talents of an intelligent, assured female performer, Late Nights & Early Mornings is drab all over. None of its elements, from expressions of female sexuality to revenge wishes against unfaithful ex-lovers, are sufficiently piercing to cut through the blandness." She felt that the album "blurs together through typical narratives of love and loss, joy and sorrow, merely approximating these emotions through the standard language established for such things. Nothing especially stands out, and though Ambrosius makes no overt mistakes on her first album, nothing she offers ever approaches making it memorable."

Commercial performance
In the United States the album debuted at number two on the Billboard 200, behind fellow Brit Adele's "21", with fellow Brits Mumford and Sons "Sigh No More" at number 3 (the first instance British artists had held the top 3 positions on the chart in over 25 years). It also peaked at number one on the Top R&B/Hip-Hop Albums, with 96,400 copies sold in the first week. By June 2011, Late Nights & Early Mornings had sold 306,700 units in the United States.

Track listing

Sample credits
"Far Away" contains a portion of the composition "You Keep Me Hangin' On" as performed by The Supremes.
"Sour Times" is a cover of the composition "Sour Times" by Portishead.
"Tears" contains a portion of the composition "Crying" as written by Norman Whitfield.

Credits and personnel 
Credits for Late Nights & Early Mornings from AllMusic.

Marsha Ambrosius – Composer, Primary Artist, Producer
Glynis Selina Arban – Photography
Geoff Barrow – Composer
Adam Blackstone – Bass, Bass (Upright)
Mikaelin 'Blue' Bluespruce – Engineer, Mixing
Henry Brooks – Composer
Nell Brown – Engineer
Canei Finch – Composer, Mixing, Producer
Vidal Davis – Composer, Drum Programming, Mixing, Producer
DJ Aktive  – Scratching, Turntables
Lamont Dozier – Composer
Peter Edge – Producer
Robyn Fernandes – Stylist
Focus... – Engineer, Instrumentation, Producer
Jesus Garnica – Assistant
Beth Gibbons – Composer
Erwin Gorostiza – Creative Director
Andre Harris – Composer, Engineer, Producer
Rich Harrison – Composer, Producer
Brandon D. Henderson – Engineer
Lauryn Hill – Composer
Brian Holland – Composer
Eddie Holland – Composer

Rayfield Holloman – Guitar, Musician
Michelle Holme – Art Direction
Jaycen Joshua – Mixing
Trevor Jerideau – Producer
JJ – Make-Up
Just Blaze – Producer
Alicia Keys – Composer
Ryan Moys – Engineer
Reggie Perry – Composer
Oscar Ramirez – Engineer
Montez Roberts – Engineer
Darrell Robinson – Brushes, Musician
Lalo Schifrin – Composer
Tippi Shorter – Hai Soon
Sterling Simms – Composer
Justin Smith – Composer
Syience – Musician, Producer
Otis Turner – Composer
Adrian Utley – Composer
Ryan West – Mixing
Norman Whitfield – Composer
Andrew Wright – Engineer

Charts

Weekly charts

Year-end charts

References

2011 debut albums
Marsha Ambrosius albums
Albums produced by Dre & Vidal
Albums produced by Focus...
Albums produced by Just Blaze
Albums produced by Rich Harrison
J Records albums